Kavita Puri is a British journalist, radio broadcaster, and author. Her 2019 book, Partition Voices: Untold British Stories, is based on her award-winning BBC Radio 4 documentary series of the same name.

She appeared on the podcast The Literary City with Ramjee Chandran to discuss her book, Partition Voices.

Biography 
Puri studied law at St Catharine's College at the University of Cambridge, graduating in 1995.

Puri has worked on BBC Newsnight as a political producer, film producer and assistant editor, and as the editor of Our World, a foreign affairs documentary programme. Her 2014 BBC Radio 4 series, Three Pounds in My Pocket, told the stories of South Asians who migrated to post-war Britain. In 2015, Puri was named Journalist of the Year by the Asian Media Awards.

In Partition Voices, a three-part series produced for BBC Radio 4 in 2017, Puri documented the stories of Colonial British and British Asians who lived through the 1947 Partition of India. Partition Voices won the Royal Historical Society's Radio and Podcast Award and its overall Public History Prize. In 2019, she published a book, Partition Voices: Untold British Stories, based on the series. In Literary Review, John Keay described the book as "the closest thing to a partition memorial currently on offer," and a "heartfelt and beautifully judged book".

In 2018, then-Prime Minister Theresa May appointed Puri as a trustee of the Victoria and Albert Museum for a period of four years.

References

External links
 

Living people
Alumni of St Catharine's College, Cambridge
BBC newsreaders and journalists
British broadcast news analysts
British reporters and correspondents
British Asian writers
Year of birth missing (living people)